The 2002–03 New York Rangers season was the franchise's 77th season. In the regular season, the Rangers posted a 32–36–10–4 record, finishing fourth in the Atlantic Division. The Rangers' ninth-place finish in the Eastern Conference left them out of the Stanley Cup playoffs for the sixth straight season.

The Rangers entered the season under the supervision of former Colorado Avalanche assistant coach and New York Islanders star Bryan Trottier in his first head coaching role. With the team on the outside of the playoff picture, he was fired after 54 games and replaced with general manager Glen Sather.

The Rangers saw a major milestone reached as goaltender Mike Richter won his 300th game with the team. Shortly thereafter, he suffered a concussion against the Edmonton Oilers when Todd Marchant accidentally struck his head with his knee. Combined with a skull fracture Richter suffered toward the end of the previous season when hit in the face with a slap shot, it was the second such injury he suffered in the previous eight months and caused him to miss the rest of the season. Richter retired before the start of the next season.

Regular season

Final standings

Schedule and results

|- align="center" bgcolor="#CCFFCC"
| 1 || October 9 || @ Carolina Hurricanes || 4–1 || 1–0–0–0 || 
|- align="center" bgcolor="#FFBBBB"
| 2 || October 11 || Montreal Canadiens || 4–1 || 1–1–0–0 || 
|- align="center" bgcolor="#FFBBBB"
| 3 || October 12 || @ Pittsburgh Penguins || 6–0 || 1–2–0–0 || 
|- align="center" bgcolor="#CCFFCC"
| 4 || October 15 || Toronto Maple Leafs || 5–4 || 2–2–0–0 || 
|- align="center" bgcolor="white"
| 5 || October 17 || @ Buffalo Sabres || 4–4 OT || 2–2–1–0 || 
|- align="center" bgcolor="white"
| 6 || October 19 || Nashville Predators || 2–2 OT || 2–2–2–0 || 
|- align="center" bgcolor="#FFBBBB"
| 7 || October 21 || Tampa Bay Lightning || 4–2 || 2–3–2–0 || 
|- align="center" bgcolor="#FFBBBB"
| 8 || October 23 || Washington Capitals || 2–1 || 2–4–2–0 || 
|- align="center" bgcolor="#FFBBBB"
| 9 || October 25 || Los Angeles Kings || 6–2 || 2–5–2–0 || 
|- align="center" bgcolor="#CCFFCC"
| 10 || October 26 || @ Toronto Maple Leafs || 4–3 || 3–5–2–0 || 
|- align="center" bgcolor="#CCFFCC"
| 11 || October 28 || Phoenix Coyotes || 3–2 OT || 4–5–2–0 || 
|- align="center" bgcolor="#FFBBBB"
| 12 || October 30 || @ Tampa Bay Lightning || 3–0 || 4–6–2–0 || 
|-

|- align="center" bgcolor="#FFBBBB"
| 13 || November 2 || @ Boston Bruins || 3–2 || 4–7–2–0 || 
|- align="center" bgcolor="#FFBBBB"
| 14 || November 3 || St. Louis Blues || 3–2 || 4–8–2–0 || 
|- align="center" bgcolor="#CCFFCC"
| 15 || November 5 || Edmonton Oilers || 5–2 || 5–8–2–0 || 
|- align="center" bgcolor="#CCFFCC"
| 16 || November 7 || Calgary Flames || 1–0 OT || 6–8–2–0 || 
|- align="center" bgcolor="#FFBBBB"
| 17 || November 9 || @ Columbus Blue Jackets || 6–3 || 6–9–2–0 || 
|- align="center" bgcolor="#CCFFCC"
| 18 || November 11 || @ San Jose Sharks || 5–4 || 7–9–2–0 || 
|- align="center" bgcolor="#CCFFCC"
| 19 || November 14 || @ Calgary Flames || 2–1 || 8–9–2–0 || 
|- align="center" bgcolor="#FFBBBB"
| 20 || November 16 || @ Vancouver Canucks || 3–1 || 8–10–2-0 || 
|- align="center" bgcolor="#CCFFCC"
| 21 || November 19 || Mighty Ducks of Anaheim || 3–2 OT || 9–10–2–0 || 
|- align="center" bgcolor="white"
| 22 || November 21 || @ New Jersey Devils || 4–4 OT || 9–10–3–0 || 
|- align="center" bgcolor="#FFBBBB"
| 23 || November 23 || New York Islanders || 3–1 || 9–11–3–0 || 
|- align="center" bgcolor="#CCFFCC"
| 24 || November 25 || Carolina Hurricanes || 3–1 || 10–11–3–0 || 
|- align="center" bgcolor="#FFBBBB"
| 25 || November 28 || @ Atlanta Thrashers || 7–4 || 10–12–3–0 || 
|- align="center" bgcolor="white"
| 26 || November 29 || @ Dallas Stars || 3–3 OT || 10–12–4–0 || 
|-

|- align="center" bgcolor="#CCFFCC"
| 27 || December 1 || Tampa Bay Lightning || 4–3 || 11–12–4–0 || 
|- align="center" bgcolor="#CCFFCC"
| 28 || December 3 || Columbus Blue Jackets || 5–3 || 12–12–4–0 || 
|- align="center" bgcolor="#FF6F6F"
| 29 || December 5 || @ Philadelphia Flyers || 3–2 OT || 12–12–4–1 || 
|- align="center" bgcolor="#FFBBBB"
| 30 || December 6 || Buffalo Sabres || 4–1 || 12–13–4–1 || 
|- align="center" bgcolor="#FFBBBB"
| 31 || December 8 || Boston Bruins || 4–1 || 12–14–4–1 || 
|- align="center" bgcolor="#FFBBBB"
| 32 || December 11 || Chicago Blackhawks || 4–3 || 12–15–4–1 || 
|- align="center" bgcolor="#FFBBBB"
| 33 || December 14 || @ Toronto Maple Leafs || 4–1 || 12–16–4–1 || 
|- align="center" bgcolor="#CCFFCC"
| 34 || December 16 || San Jose Sharks || 2–1 OT || 13–16–4–1 || 
|- align="center" bgcolor="#FFBBBB"
| 35 || December 19 || Montreal Canadiens || 3–1 || 13–17–4–1 || 
|- align="center" bgcolor="#FFBBBB"
| 36 || December 21 || @ Detroit Red Wings || 3–2 || 13–18–4–1 || 
|- align="center" bgcolor="white"
| 37 || December 23 || New Jersey Devils || 2–2 OT || 13–18–5–1 || 
|- align="center" bgcolor="#FFBBBB"
| 38 || December 26 || Pittsburgh Penguins || 6–1 || 13–19–5–1 || 
|- align="center" bgcolor="#CCFFCC"
| 39 || December 28 || @ Florida Panthers || 2–1 OT || 14–19–5–1 || 
|- align="center" bgcolor="#FFBBBB"
| 40 || December 29 || @ Tampa Bay Lightning || 5–3 || 14–20–5–1 || 
|- align="center" bgcolor="#CCFFCC"
| 41 || December 31 || @ Carolina Hurricanes || 2–0 || 15–20–5–1 || 
|-

|- align="center" bgcolor="white"
| 42 || January 4 || Washington Capitals || 2–2 OT || 15–20–6–1 || 
|- align="center" bgcolor="#FFBBBB"
| 43 || January 6 || Ottawa Senators || 5–2 || 15–21–6–1 || 
|- align="center" bgcolor="#CCFFCC"
| 44 || January 8 || Carolina Hurricanes || 5–1 || 16–21–6–1 || 
|- align="center" bgcolor="#FFBBBB"
| 45 || January 9 || @ Montreal Canadiens || 3–2 || 16–22–6–1 || 
|- align="center" bgcolor="#CCFFCC"
| 46 || January 11 || @ Pittsburgh Penguins || 3–1 || 17–22–6–1 || 
|- align="center" bgcolor="#CCFFCC"
| 47 || January 13 || Toronto Maple Leafs || 5–1 || 18–22–6–1 || 
|- align="center" bgcolor="#CCFFCC"
| 48 || January 15 || @ Washington Capitals || 2–1 OT || 19–22–6–1 || 
|- align="center" bgcolor="#FFBBBB"
| 49 || January 19 || Philadelphia Flyers || 4–2 || 19–23–6–1 || 
|- align="center" bgcolor="#CCFFCC"
| 50 || January 21 || @ New York Islanders || 5–0 || 20–23–6–1 || 
|- align="center" bgcolor="#CCFFCC"
| 51 || January 23 || @ Nashville Predators || 4–2 || 21–23–6–1 || 
|- align="center" bgcolor="#FFBBBB"
| 52 || January 25 || Atlanta Thrashers || 4–1 || 21–24–6–1 || 
|- align="center" bgcolor="#FFBBBB"
| 53 || January 26 || @ Washington Capitals || 7–2 || 21–25–6–1 || 
|- align="center" bgcolor="#FFBBBB"
| 54 || January 28 || @ Atlanta Thrashers || 5–2 || 21–26–6–1 || 
|- align="center" bgcolor="#FF6F6F"
| 55 || January 30 || Colorado Avalanche || 4–3 OT || 21–26–6–2 || 
|-

|- align="center" bgcolor="#FFBBBB"
| 56 || February 5 || Ottawa Senators || 5–3 || 21–27–6–2 || 
|- align="center" bgcolor="white"
| 57 || February 6 || @ St. Louis Blues || 4–4 OT || 21–27–7–2 || 
|- align="center" bgcolor="#FFBBBB"
| 58 || February 8 || @ Philadelphia Flyers || 2–1 || 21–28–7–2 || 
|- align="center" bgcolor="#CCFFCC"
| 59 || February 12 || @ Florida Panthers || 3–1 || 22–28–7–2 || 
|- align="center" bgcolor="#CCFFCC"
| 60 || February 14 || Pittsburgh Penguins || 1–0 || 23–28–7–2 || 
|- align="center" bgcolor="#FFBBBB"
| 61 || February 15 || @ Buffalo Sabres || 5–4 || 23–29–7–2 || 
|- align="center" bgcolor="#FFBBBB"
| 62 || February 17 || @ Ottawa Senators || 3–2 || 23–30–7–2 || 
|- align="center" bgcolor="#CCFFCC"
| 63 || February 19 || @ Minnesota Wild || 4–2 || 24–30–7–2 || 
|- align="center" bgcolor="#CCFFCC"
| 64 || February 21 || @ Mighty Ducks of Anaheim || 6–2 || 25–30–7–2 || 
|- align="center" bgcolor="#FFBBBB"
| 65 || February 23 || @ Colorado Avalanche || 4–1 || 25–31–7–2 || 
|- align="center" bgcolor="white"
| 66 || February 25 || @ New Jersey Devils || 3–3 OT || 25–31–8–2 || 
|- align="center" bgcolor="#CCFFCC"
| 67 || February 27 || Boston Bruins || 4–1 || 26–31–8–2 || 
|-

|- align="center" bgcolor="#CCFFCC"
| 68 || March 1 || Florida Panthers || 5–2 || 27–31–8–2 || 
|- align="center" bgcolor="white"
| 69 || March 3 || New York Islanders || 1–1 OT || 27–31–9–2 || 
|- align="center" bgcolor="#CCFFCC"
| 70 || March 7 || Philadelphia Flyers || 5–1 || 28–31–9–2 || 
|- align="center" bgcolor="#FFBBBB"
| 71 || March 10 || Florida Panthers || 2–1 || 28–32–9–2 || 
|- align="center" bgcolor="#FF6F6F"
| 72 || March 13 || @ Ottawa Senators || 3–2 OT || 28–32–9–3 || 
|- align="center" bgcolor="#FFBBBB"
| 73 || March 15 || @ New Jersey Devils || 3–1 || 28–33–9–3 || 
|- align="center" bgcolor="#CCFFCC"
| 74 || March 17 || New York Islanders || 1–0 || 29–33–9–3 || 
|- align="center" bgcolor="#CCFFCC"
| 75 || March 19 || Buffalo Sabres || 3–0 || 30–33–9–3 || 
|- align="center" bgcolor="#CCFFCC"
| 76 || March 22 || @ Philadelphia Flyers || 2–1 || 31–33–9–3 || 
|- align="center" bgcolor="#FFBBBB"
| 77 || March 26 || Pittsburgh Penguins || 3–1 || 31–34–9–3 || 
|- align="center" bgcolor="#CCFFCC"
| 78 || March 29 || @ Boston Bruins || 3–1 || 32–34–9–3 || 
|- align="center" bgcolor="#FF6F6F"
| 79 || March 31 || Atlanta Thrashers || 4–3 OT || 32–34–9–4 || 
|-

|- align="center" bgcolor="white"
| 80 || April 1 || @ New York Islanders || 2–2 OT || 32–34–10–4 || 
|- align="center" bgcolor="#FFBBBB"
| 81 || April 4 || New Jersey Devils || 2–1 || 32–35–10–4 || 
|- align="center" bgcolor="#FFBBBB"
| 82 || April 5 || @ Montreal Canadiens || 5–4 || 32–36–10–4 || 
|-

|-
| Legend:

Player statistics

Scoring
 Position abbreviations: C = Center; D = Defense; G = Goaltender; LW = Left Wing; RW = Right Wing
  = Joined team via a transaction (e.g., trade, waivers, signing) during the season. Stats reflect time with the Rangers only.
  = Left team via a transaction (e.g., trade, waivers, release) during the season. Stats reflect time with the Rangers only.

Goaltending
  = Joined team via a transaction (e.g., trade, waivers, signing) during the season. Stats reflect time with the Rangers only.
  = Left team via a transaction (e.g., trade, waivers, release) during the season. Stats reflect time with the Rangers only.

Sources:

Awards and records

Awards

Transactions
The Rangers were involved in the following transactions from June 14, 2002, the day after the deciding game of the 2002 Stanley Cup Finals, through June 9, 2003, the day of the deciding game of the 2003 Stanley Cup Finals.

Trades

Players acquired

Players lost

Signings

Draft picks
New York's picks at the 2002 NHL Entry Draft in Toronto, Ontario, at the Air Canada Centre.

Notes

References

New York Rangers seasons
New York Rangers
New York Rangers
New York Rangers
New York Rangers
 in Manhattan
Madison Square Garden